KOOC (106.3 MHz) is a commercial FM radio station, licensed to Belton, Texas and serving the Killeen-Temple radio market with a Rhythmic Contemporary radio format. This station is branded as "B106.3" under ownership of Townsquare Media, through licensee Townsquare Media Killeen-Temple License, LLC.  The station's studios are located in Temple, and its transmitter is located between Belton and Nolanville.

Notable programming includes the syndicated Rickey Smiley Morning Show.

External links
B106.3 - Official Website

OOC
Rhythmic contemporary radio stations in the United States
Radio stations established in 1987
Townsquare Media radio stations